Opuntia cespitosa, commonly called the eastern prickly pear, is a species of cactus native to North America. It is most common west of the Appalachian Mountains and east of the Mississippi River, where it is found in the Midwest, Upper South and in Ontario. Its natural habitat is in dry, open areas, such as outcrops, glades, and barrens.

Opuntia cespitosa is a prostrate succulent shrub, usually no more than 1-2 segments tall. It has large white spines, and a low layer of reddish-brown glochids, which break off in the skin if touched. It produces a yellow and red flower in late spring.

This species was historically included in a broadly-defined Opuntia humifusa group, which is found further to the east. Opuntia cespitosa differs from Opuntia humifusa in its flowers having a red center.

It is invasive in South Africa. Some Hypogeococcus mealybugs are used as biological pest controls of this and other invasive cactuses there.

References

cespitosa
Taxa named by Constantine Samuel Rafinesque